Tempane is one of the constituencies represented in the Parliament of Ghana. It elects one Member of Parliament (MP) by the first past the post system of election. The Tempane constituency is located in the Garu-Tempane District of the Upper East Region of Ghana. It was created in 2012 by dividing the Garu-Tempane constituency in two.

Boundaries 
The seat is located entirely within the Garu-Tempane District of the Upper East Region of Ghana.

Members of Parliament

Elections

See also 

 List of Ghana Parliament constituencies
 List of political parties in Ghana

References 

Parliamentary constituencies in the Upper East Region